Idiocnemis is a genus of damselflies in the family Platycnemididae. They are distributed on New Guinea and the surrounding islands. There are 20 species.

The genus is divided into two groups. The Idiocnemis inornata group are mainly reddish brown in color with turquoise markings. The Idiocnemis bidentata group are brown to black with purple, blue, turquoise, or yellow markings. The groups can also be distinguished by the shape of the penis.

Species
Species include:
Idiocnemis adelbertensis
Idiocnemis australis
Idiocnemis bidentata
Idiocnemis chloropleura
Idiocnemis dagnyae
Idiocnemis fissidens
Idiocnemis govermasensis
Idiocnemis huonensis
Idiocnemis inaequidens
Idiocnemis inornata
Idiocnemis kimminsi
Idiocnemis leonardi
Idiocnemis louisiadensis
Idiocnemis mertoni
Idiocnemis nigriventris
Idiocnemis obliterata
Idiocnemis patriciae
Idiocnemis polhemi
Idiocnemis pruinescens
Idiocnemis strumidens
Idiocnemis zebrina

References

Platycnemididae
Odonata of Asia
Zygoptera genera
Taxa named by Edmond de Sélys Longchamps